Cranage Hall is a former country house in the village of Cranage, Cheshire, England.  It was built in 1828–29 for Lawrence Armitstead, and designed by Lewis Wyatt.  In 1932 a parallel wing was added.  Since the hospital closed, it has been used as a hotel and conference centre owned and run by the Principal Hayley hotel group.  The building is constructed in red brick with blue brick diapering, and in yellow sandstone.  It is roofed in slate.  The architectural style is Elizabethan.  The building is in two storeys plus a basement, and it has eight bays. The first and fourth bays are in stone; the others are in brick. In front of the sixth and seven bays is a two-storey stone porch with four fluted Doric columns, an entablature with a frieze, and a balcony with an openwork balustrade.  Between the third and fourth bays is a slim octagonal tower with an ogee cap and a weathervane.  The house is recorded in the National Heritage List for England as a designated Grade II listed building.

Present Day
Cranage Hall was redeveloped by Hayley Conference Centres and reopened as a 120 bedroom, 29 meeting room hotel and conference venue with a leisure club in 1998. In 2007 Hayley Conference Centres was bought by and merged with Principal Hotels to become the Principal Hayley group. Since the 2016 merger with De Vere Venues, the hotel was rebranded as De Vere Cranage Estate and now has 152 bedrooms including 2 suites in the mansion house.

See also

Listed buildings in Cranage

References

External links
De Vere Cranage Estate- Official Website

Country houses in Cheshire
Hotels in Cheshire
Houses completed in 1829
Tudor Revival architecture in England
Grade II listed houses
Grade II listed buildings in Cheshire
Country house hotels
1829 establishments in England